The Welsh Volunteers, was a short-lived Territorial Army infantry regiment of the British Army, that existed from 1967 to 1971.

History
Upon the creation of the TAVR in 1967, 5 of the Territorial Army infantry battalions of the Welsh Brigade, drastically reduced in size to form companies of the Welsh Volunteers. Its initial structure was:
Headquarters Company, at Maindy Barracks, Cardiff(reduction of 6th Battalion, Welch Regiment)
A Company (Royal Welch Fusiliers), at Wrexham(reduction of 4th Battalion, Royal Welch Fusiliers and part 6/7th Battalion, Royal Welch Fusiliers)
B Company (South Wales Borderers), at Raglan Barracks, Newport(reduction of 2nd Battalion, Monmouthshire Regiment)
C Company (Welch), at Pontypridd and Bridgend(reduction of 4th and 5th Battalions, Welch Regiment)

Not long after its creation, the regiment was disbanded with its sub-units being placed back under their respective regiments. HQ, B, and C Companies went to 3rd Battalion, Royal Regiment of Wales; and A and D Companies, went to 3rd Battalion, Royal Welch Fusiliers.

References

Military units and formations established in 1967
Military units and formations disestablished in 1971
Royal Welch Fusiliers
Welch Regiment
South Wales Borderers
Infantry regiments of the British Army
1967 establishments in England